Dygra Films was a computer animation studio located in A Coruña, Spain, founded in 1987 as a graphic design studio. After producing many interactive CD-ROM titles, they began their work on their first feature-length CG film The Living Forest in 1997 and established the name Dygra Films in 2000.

They have also released computer-animated short films: Taxia, and a trilogy of Mosquis films for Manos Unidas, a charitable organization in Spain.

Feature-length films 
 The Living Forest (El Bosque animado) — August 3, 2001
 Midsummer Dream (El Sueño de una noche de San Juan) — July 1, 2005
 Spirit of the Forest (Espíritu del bosque) — sequel to The Living Forest — September 12, 2008

Scheduled, but unreleased
 Holy Night! — est. December 2010
 The Golden Donkey (El Asno de Oro) — 2011
 In Search of Oniria aka Lost & Found (En Busca de Oniria) — est. 2012

References

External links 
  (down as of January 16, 2011)
 
 
 Short film 

Mass media companies of Spain
Spanish animation studios
Film production companies of Spain
Mass media companies established in 1987
Spanish companies established in 1987
Companies based in Galicia (Spain)